York School may refer to one of the following:

York School (California), a private Episcopalian school, grades 8–12, on the outskirts of Monterey, California, United States
York School (Toronto), a private non-denominational JK to grade 12 school in Toronto, Ontario, Canada